The Smile of the Snake is an album by saxophonist James Spaulding which was recorded in 1996 and released on the HighNote label.

Reception

The AllMusic review by Scott Yanow stated: "One of the most underrated saxophonists of the post-1960 era, James Spaulding has long been a passionate postbop altoist and a warm flutist. On this superior outing he is heard in top form on both of his axes (plus two appearances on bass flute) ... the result is a high-quality set of obscurities ... Spaulding digs into the songs, displays a great deal of versatility and certainly has his fiery moments. One of James Spaulding's finest allround recordings". In JazzTimes, Willard Jenkins wrote: "James Spaulding is a consistent multi-reed and flute exponent who always swings-in the true Indianapolis tradition where he was raised ... It is on alto saxophone where Spaulding has been making valuable contributions on the scene for over 30 years, yet his flute should not be overlooked in a time when jazz flute is in short supply. And dig his use of the rarely heard bass flute as an improvisational vehicle".

Track listing
 "Third Avenue" (Clifford Jordan) – 4:50
 "Serenity" (Rodgers Grant) – 5:49
 "The Smile of the Snake" (Donald Brown) – 6:05
 "Lenora" (Richard Wyands) – 4:56
 "Tonight Only" (Ron McClure) – 7:18
 "Premonition" (Geoffrey Keezer) – 6:58
 "Yes It Is" (Wyands) – 5:43
 "Panchito" (McClure) – 5:06
 "Love Is Not a Dream" Idrees Sulieman, Kathe Laursen) – 5:48
 "Havana Days (Cuba 1954)" (Brown) – 5:51

Personnel
James Spaulding – alto saxophone, flute, bass flute
Richard Wyands – piano 
Ron McClure – bass 
Tony Reedus – drums

References

HighNote Records albums
James Spaulding albums
1997 albums